Bicyclus sigiussidorum is a butterfly in the family Nymphalidae. It is found in southern Cameroon, mainland Equatorial Guinea, and north‐western Gabon. The holotype forewing length is 23 mm.

Etymology
Because of its glamorous appearance, the species was named for Ziggy Stardust, a character created by English musician David Bowie. Sigiussidorum is a Latin rendering of "Ziggy Stardust".

References

Elymniini
Butterflies described in 2015
Butterflies of Africa